Wyndham Hill-Smith  (16 February 1909 – 25 October 1990) was an Australian cricketer and wine-maker.

Cricketer
The nephew of Australia captain Clem Hill, Hill-Smith was a left-handed batsman. He attended St Peter's College, Adelaide, playing in the college cricket team that toured Ceylon in January 1928.

He played eight first-class matches for Western Australia and one for a representative Australian XI. He made his first-class debut against the touring South Africans at the WACA Ground in 1932. Opening the batting, he made 56 runs before being dismissed by Xen Balaskas.

Wine-maker
Following the death of his brother Sidney in the Kyeema aircraft crash in 1938, Hill-Smith returned to South Australia to take on the management of the family winery, Yalumba at Angaston. He led the company from 1938 to 1986. In 1980, Hill-Smith was appointed an Officer of the Order of the British Empire (OBE) for services to the wine industry and horse racing.

A grandstand at Cheltenham Park Racecourse was named the Wyndham Hill Smith Grandstand. His Wisden obituary concluded with the comment, "In later life he became famous for the liberal hospitality which he extended to touring teams at his Yalumba vineyard in South Australia."

References

External links
 Wisden obituary
 Biography on the Yalumba website

1909 births
1990 deaths
People educated at St Peter's College, Adelaide
Australian cricketers
Western Australia cricketers
Australian winemakers
Officers of the Order of the British Empire
Cricketers from South Australia
People from Angaston, South Australia